Robert Wysome (born 1946) is the English conductor of New College Chorale based in Wellington, Shropshire, is the former Conductor of the Shropshire Youth Orchestra, Musical Director for the Shropshire Music Service and a notable Pianist and Organist. He was born in South Wales and began his musical career as an organist and accompanist. He read music at Cardiff University where he studied composition with Alun Hoddinott CBE and organ with Robert Joyce at Llandaff Cathedral. He was organist at St. John the Baptist Church in Cardiff for several years before moving to Bristol where he performed widely as a conductor and accompanist, working with Bristol Opera Company, University of Bristol Symphony Orchestra and Bristol Old Vic Theatre Company.

He moved to Shropshire in 1975 to become the first Director of Music at New College, Telford. The department gained a wide reputation for its work and was featured regularly on local and national radio and television, including a series of joint projects with Welsh National Opera. Since retiring from full-time teaching in 2001, Wysome has worked as a freelance musician, particularly in the field of conducting, examining and accompanying.

In the 1980s, Wysome began working with the Shropshire Music Service and has conducted the Shropshire Youth Orchestra on many successful foreign tours, visiting Russia, Germany, France, the Netherlands, Norway, Italy, Hungary and the Czech Republic as well as regular visits to the Festival of Youth Orchestras as part of the Edinburgh Festival. He has had a huge impact on the musical lives of many young people over his time with the orchestra and his standing down from conducting in 2012 was felt to be a huge loss to the orchestra. His final tour with the orchestra to Salzburg, Austria in 2011, however, was widely considered a huge success.

Wysome continues to conduct New College Chorale, the community choir he formed in the late 1990s. The choir performs concerts every Christmas and in Spring / early Summer.

His work with various orchestra has enabled Wysome to direct concertos with many leading soloists, including Jack Brymer, Emma Johnson, Peter Donohoe, Erich Gruenberg, Alan Schiller, Robert Cohen, Michele Petri and Leeds Piano Competition winner Ricardo Castro. He has also conducted concerts of a lighter nature, working with Sir Patrick Moore, Robert Hardy CBE, Brian Kay, Jon Pertwee and Timothy West CBE.

He has also enjoyed conducting many of the popular open-air "fireworks" concerts at venues such as Castle Howard in Yorkshire, Killerton Park in Exeter and both Attingham Park and Aqualate Park in Newport, Shropshire.

In addition to this busy musical life, he has been Chairman of the Telford Arts Festival, Director of the Shropshire Schools Opera Project and has worked on the BBC 'Music in Action' television series.

References

External links
 Newport District Festival
 Jesus Christ Superstar Production 1994
 Jesus Chris Superstar Production 1994 Cast List
 Concerto Competition 2009
 Sound of Music Production 1991 Cast List
 Shropshire Young Musician of the Year
 Music Theory Tutor
 Wellington Methodist Church
 Romany Wood Cast
 Website of the New College Chorale

British male conductors (music)
Music directors
Living people
1946 births
21st-century British conductors (music)
21st-century British male musicians